Higginsville is a town in the Goldfields-Esperance Region of Western Australia. At the 2016 census, Higginsville had a population of 66.

The town was gazetted in 1907 and is believed to have been named after the prospector Patrick Justice Higgins.

The town is located on the Esperance Branch Railway, west of Lake Cowan. The currently active Higginsville Gold Mine is located nearby.

See also
 Higginsville Gold Mine

References

Ghost towns in Western Australia
Mining towns in Western Australia
Goldfields-Esperance